Vale todo, is a telenovela co-produced in 2002 by the television Rede Globo and Telemundo Hispanic arm of the U.S. network NBC. The soap opera was an adaptation of the 1988 Brazilian telenovela Vale Tudo and was released for the U.S. Hispanic market on June 17, at 21.00. Starring Mexican actress Itatí Cantoral and Peruvian actor Diego Bertie, co-starring Argentine Javier Gómez, Ana Claudia Talancon and participation of actress Zully Montero.

Cast 
 Itatí Cantoral as Raquel Accioli
 Diego Bertie as Iván Corrêa
 Javier Gómez as Marco Aurélio Alvarez
 Ana Claudia Talancón as Maria de Fátima Accioli
 Antônio Fagundes as Salvador
 Roberto Mateos as Rubén
 Germán Barrios as Octavio
 Enrique Borja as Rodolfo
 Alejandra Borrero as Helena Almeida Roittman
 Carlos Caballero as Mario
 Marisol Colero as Mercedes
 Ricardo Chávez as Felipe
 Agmeth Escaf as Alfonso Almeida Roittman
 Jorge Adrián Espíndola as Júan
 Rossana Fernández Maldonado as Beatriz
 José Luis Franco as Renato
 Alberto Guerra as Bruno
 Khotan as Pablo Argos
 Consuelo Luzardo as Celina Almeida
 Santiago Magill as Santiago
 Paulo César Quevedo as César Ribeiro
 Carla Rodríguez as Fernanda
 Julio Rodríguez Caloggero as Eugenio
 Nadia Rowinsky as Aleida
 Verónica Terán as Maria José
 Elena Toledo as Isabel
 Patricia Valdez as Dolores
 Beatriz Vásquez as Leila
 Zully Montero as Lucrécia Almeida Roittman
 Paulo Said
 Santiago Maschender

External links 
 

Telemundo telenovelas
2002 telenovelas
American telenovelas
2002 American television series debuts
2002 American television series endings
Spanish-language American telenovelas
American television series based on Brazilian television series